My Million Pound Menu was a BBC reality tv television series which ran from 2018-2019, where budding restauranteurs would present food concepts to a panel of investors in hopes of winning investment. It was presented by Fred Sirieix, a professional maitre d'hotel turned television personality. It was described the Guardian as "Dragons' Den meets MasterChef".

The programme was broadcast on BBC Two, with the first series of six episodes broadcast from 17 May to 21 June 2018. The second series also comprising six episodes was broadcast from 8 January-19 February 2019. Although not cancelled, no further series were made, possibly due to the 2020 Covid-19 pandemic. Episodes are now available to stream on Netflix. Investment offer ranged from £95,000 to nearly £1 million.

Development

The UK restaurant industry is worth £35 billion a year. The vast majority of restaurants close within a year of opening. Meredith Chambers, managing director of production company Electric Ray, said he came up with the concept after meeting the agent of well known chef who said that it was common practice for prospective restauranteurs seeking investors to make them dinner to demonstrate the concept and their skills. Chambers felt this would translate well to a reality tv format. The show also discussed and depicted trends within the culinary industry in the UK, such as the increasing popularity of vegan food and up-and-coming world cuisines. Million Pound Menu was praised for its depiction of the process of developing a successful restaurant business, with Fred Sirieix commenting: "Everybody in the hospitality industry dreams of owning their own restaurant and they all worry about getting capital but we show it’s important you also meet the right investors and that you have a simple but scalable concept. It’s not just about great cooking, you need knowledge of HR, marketing and basic finance too."

Format

Originally titled Million Pound Menu, in each episode of the first series, a number of participants (it is never shown how many) pitch their ideas via video conference to a table of investors. Two new restaurant ideas are selected to move through to the next stage - their own pop-up restaurant in Manchester for two days in an attempt to gain backing from the investors. Each teams gets a restaurant opposite the other on the same street. The two participants/teams are given two weeks and access to an interior design team to produce a concept that aligns with their vision. 

On the first evening, the restaurant runs a soft launch evening service (where customers receive a 50% discount) and serves the investors dinner from their menu. The next day, the participants meet with interested investors individually to go through their business plan and answer questions. At this point, investors who are thinking of investing give an indication of what their proposed investment would likely look like - often the investors are looking for promising concepts to gave spaces in their existing developments. After this, the participants then run a lunch service which the investors also attend, often sitting at the bar so they can observe the kitchen operating. Investors can drop out at any point, but after lunch, they have until 8pm to decide whether they wish to invest or not.  If multiple investors make offers, the team picks the investor they want to work with.

In series two, the format was changed to give investors greater opportunities to interact with the different aspects of the concept. Three concept teams of hopeful restaurateurs prepare their signature dish for four potential investors, who make comments to camera about the value of the idea. By majority vote, the investors select one team to open a two-day pop-up restaurant in Manchester. (Investors can drop out at any point). Once in Manchester, the concept team runs a soft-launch dinner service. The investors dine with each other during this service. On the morning of the second day, the concept team has one-hour business meetings with each investor. Afterwards, the team conducts a full-price lunch, where the remaining investors dine alone and also interview customers. Afterwards, the investors are given a deadline of 7pm to return to the restaurant to present an offer.

Investors

The panel of investors changed with every episode, but included: 

 Atul Kochhar, celebrity chef
 Scott Collins, co-founder of burger and cocktail group MEATliquor
 Darrel Connell, partner at investment group Imbiba Partnership
 Jeremy Roberts, CEO of Living Ventures, a restaurant and bar group
 Tim Gee, Property Director at Allied London, a property development and investment company
 Chris Miller, Founder of White Rabbit Fund, a restaurant investment group
 David Page, Chairman of The Fulham Shore, a restaurant investment group
 Jamie Barber, a restauranteur of several food chains
 Shruti Ajitsaria, angel investor and lawyer for Allen and Overy

Series 2 only:

 Charlie McVeigh, pub chain owner
 Maurice Abboudi, angel investor and executive director of K10 Japanese restaurants
 Jane O'Riordan, angel investor and Group Strategy Director of Nando's
 Matt Farrell, a Liverpool based food and drink investor
 Laura Harper-Hinton, CEO of restaurant group Caravan
 Will Shu, CEO of Deliveroo

Broadcast history

Series 1

Series 2

References

External links

2018 British television series debuts
2019 British television series endings
2010s British documentary television series
BBC Television shows
BBC reality television shows
Business-related television series in the United Kingdom
Business mass media in the United Kingdom
English-language television shows
Hospitality industry in the United Kingdom
Television series by Sony Pictures Television